Brachytome is a genus of 8 species of flowering plants in the family Rubiaceae. It was described by Joseph Dalton Hooker in 1871. It occurs in mainland Southeast Asia from Bangladesh, east to south central China and south to Peninsular Malaysia.

Species
 Brachytome hainanensis C.Y.Wu ex W.C.Chen - Hainan, Vietnam
 Brachytome hirtella Hu - Tibet, Yunnan, Vietnam
 Brachytome kachinensis Govaerts - Myanmar (Burma)
 Brachytome pitardii Tirveng. - Vietnam
 Brachytome russellii Deb & M.G.Gangop. - Myanmar (Burma)
 Brachytome scortechinii King & Gamble - Laos,  Thailand, Malaysia 
 Brachytome wallichiii Hook.f. - Yunnan, Assam, Bangladesh, Cambodia, Burma, Vietnam 
 Brachytome wardii C.E.C.Fisch. - Myanmar (Burma)

References

External links
Brachytome in the World Checklist of Rubiaceae
Brachytome wallichii picture

Rubiaceae genera
Gardenieae
Taxa named by Joseph Dalton Hooker